Journey to the Planets is a video game for the Atari 8-bit family. The player takes on the role of an interplanetary adventurer who has to solve various puzzles on the planets on which he lands. The game was originally released on disk and cassette in 1982  by JV Software. In 1983, Roklan Software published a cartridge version with some differences from the original.

Plot

At the start of the game, the character is located on a strange planet where the character can equip itself with a weapon, refuel energy, and take off to space in a spaceship. The character then needs to pilot through space while avoiding comets and conserving energy until a new planet is found for exploration. After landing on the newly discovered planet, the character needs to fend off hostile aliens, solve puzzles, and recover various artifacts. Energy is consumed by the spaceship, the weapon, and upon dying.

The goal is to return to the character's home planet by exploring the universe and solving the various puzzles being presented with.

References

External links
Journey to the Planets JV Software version at Atari Mania
Journey to the Planets Roklan version at Atari Mania

1982 video games
Action-adventure games
Atari 8-bit family games
Atari 8-bit family-only games
Video games developed in the United States